Peter Augustus Maier House, also known as the Maier-Pollard House , is a historic home located at Evansville, Indiana, United States. It was built in 1873, and is a -story, "L"-plan, Italianate style brick dwelling.  It has a low-pitched slate cross-gable roof and features a bracketed cornice and paneled frieze.  Also on the property is a contributing carriage house and original wrought iron fence.

It was added to the National Register of Historic Places in 1982.

References

Houses on the National Register of Historic Places in Indiana
Italianate architecture in Indiana
Houses completed in 1873
Houses in Evansville, Indiana
National Register of Historic Places in Evansville, Indiana